Tawfiiq District is a district in the north-central Mudug region of Somalia. Its capital lies at Tawfiiq.

References

Mudug
Districts of Somalia